Bob DeSimone (born April 15, 1946) is an American actor who has starred in several movies. He is perhaps best known for his role as Billy, the cocaine-snorting mental health worker, in the 1985 horror movie Friday the 13th: A New Beginning. His other films were Savage Streets (1984), and Angel III: The Final Chapter. DeSimone also appeared on the hit comedy show, Make Me Laugh and was a headliner at The Comedy Store and Improv during their heyday, working with Jay Leno, David Letterman, Richard Pryor and Jerry Seinfeld.

Before DeSimone turned to comedy and acting, he was, (and still is) an accomplished drummer. Almost immediately after arriving in California, he was in demand. The early 1970s found DeSimone playing with many top bands in and out of the studios. He was a fixture at the Ash Grove club in West Hollywood, noted for promoting up and coming blues and folk musicians. Teaming up with Bernie Pearl, they both backed Lightnin' Hopkins, Big Mama Thornton, The Bernie Pearl Band, Dr. John, Albert King, Luke "Long Gone" Miles, Taj Mahal and Chuck Berry.

From there he signed on with Atlantic Records with a popular Country Rock band named, "Country". With a signature sound, beautiful harmonies, strong musicianship and all original material, they were described by many as a "Rhythmic Cross Between Crosby Stills & Nash, and "The Band". Signed by Peter Asher, they opened for America, Fleetwood Mac, Linda Ronstadt, and the Bee Gees. COUNTRY featured future Grammy award winning songwriter Tom Snow, UK Fanzine FANTASTIC EXPEDITION published their full story in 2014 in conjunction with all the surviving band members.

DeSimone left acting in 1983 and began his own successful business. He still plays drums and is currently working with local R&B, blues and rock bands in Southern California. As he stated in a Friday 13th interview:"Drumming will always be in my blood"

He married his girlfriend, Lisa Stern in 1994, and together they have two daughters, Amanda and Gianna. They live in Santa Rosa Valley, California

Filmography
Chatterbox (1977) - Cab Driver
The Seduction (1982) - Photographer 
The Concrete Jungle (1982) - Parelli's Assistant
Savage Streets (1984) - Mr. Meeker
Friday the 13th: A New Beginning (1985) - Billy
Angel III: The Final Chapter (1988) - Porn Director

External links

Fantastic Expedition Fanzine

1946 births
American male film actors
Living people
Male actors from Boston